Hard Rock Cafe is a chain of restaurants based from London.

Hard Rock Cafe may also refer to:

"Hard Rock Cafe", a side one of The Doors' 1970 album, Morrison Hotel
"Hard Rock Cafe", a song recorded by Carole King in 1977, reaching number 30 on the US Hot 100